Eternity: Best of 93 – 98 was the 1st compilation album by hard rock band Takara released in 1998 on Point Music & Saraya Recordings.

Track listing
 "Spotlight"
 "Two Hearts Together"
 "Restless Heart"
 "Fallen Angel"
 "Colors Fade"
 "When Darkness Falls"
 "Days of Dawn"
 "Your Love"
 "December"
 "Last Mistake"
 "Lonely Shade of Blue"
 "Take U Down"
 "Your Love 2night"
 "Don't Wanna Be Alone"
 "Blind in Paradise"
 "Say U'll Stay"
 "Restless Heart" (Acoustic)
 "Your Love" (Acoustic)

Personnel
Jeff Scott Soto – lead vocals
Gary Schutt – bass
Carl Demarco – bass
Neal Grusky – guitar
Eric Ragno – keyboards
Robert Duda – drums
Bob Daisley - bass on tracks 7,8,14

References
 Official Website

1998 greatest hits albums
Takara (band) albums